Solange Chaput-Rolland,  (May 14, 1919 – November 1, 2001) was a Canadian journalist, author, lecturer, politician, and Senator.

Born in Montreal, the daughter of Émile Chaput and Rosalie Loranger, she received her education from the Couvent d'Outremont, the Sorbonne and the Institut Catholique de Paris. Her brother, Yves Chaput was the husband of Françoise Poliquin, daughter of Jean Poliquin, grandfather of Jean-Nicolas De Surmont.

During the 1950s she worked as a journalist for the CBC with a young Jeanne Sauvé with whom she remained friends until Sauvé's death.

In 1979, she was elected to the National Assembly of Quebec in a by-election in the riding of Prevost. She was defeated in 1981.

She was appointed to the Senate in 1988 representing the senatorial division of Mille Isles, Quebec. She sat as a Progressive Conservative and retired in 1994.

In 1975, she was made an Officer of the Order of Canada. In 1985, she was made an Officer of the National Order of Quebec.

In 1941, she married André Rolland.

Electoral record

Selected works
 Chers ennemis (1963, with Gwethalyn Graham)
 Mon pays, Québec ou le Canada? (1966)
 Regards 1967: Québec Année Zéro (1968)
 Regards 1968: Une ou deux sociétés justes (1969)
 Regards 1969: La seconde conquête (1970)
 Regards 1970-1971: Les heures sauvages (1972)
 De l'unité à la réalité (1981)
 Le Mystère Québec (1984)
 Et tournons la page... (1989)
 Le  et l'apaisement (1990)
 Léon Dion, hier et demain (1991)
 Chère sénateur (1992)
 Les Élus et les Déçus (1996)

External links
 
 
 CBC archives clip where she speaks of her friendship with the late Jeanne Sauvé
  Fonds Solange Chaput-Rolland (R6637) at Library and Archives Canada

1919 births
2001 deaths
Canadian senators from Quebec
Women members of the Senate of Canada
Canadian non-fiction writers in French
Institut Catholique de Paris alumni
Officers of the National Order of Quebec
Officers of the Order of Canada
Politicians from Montreal
Progressive Conservative Party of Canada senators
Quebec Liberal Party MNAs
University of Paris alumni
Women MNAs in Quebec
Writers from Montreal
20th-century Canadian women politicians
Canadian women non-fiction writers
Canadian expatriates in France